The 1987 Tel Aviv Open was a men's tennis tournament played on outdoor hard courts that was part of the 1987 Nabisco Grand Prix. It was played at the Israel Tennis Centers in the Tel Aviv District city of Ramat HaSharon, Israel from October 12 through October 19, 1987. Third-seeded Amos Mansdorf  won the singles title.

Finals

Singles

 Amos Mansdorf defeated  Brad Gilbert 3–6, 6–3, 6–4
 It was Mansdorf's only title of the year and the 2nd of his career.

Doubles

 Gilad Bloom /  Shahar Perkiss defeated  Wolfgang Popp /  Huub van Boeckel 6–2, 6–4
 It was Bloom's 1st title of the year and the 1st of his career. It was Perkiss' only title of the year and the 1st of his career.

References

External links
 ITF tournament edition details

 
Tel Aviv Open
Tel Aviv Open
Tel Aviv Open